Lucien Lupi (14 July 1926 in Grasse – 30 May 2005 in Paris) was a French lyrical barytone and middle of the road singer.

Lucien Lupi was the husband of Dany Lauri, also a lyrical artist, and the father of singer Lauri Lupi.

Bibliography 
 Dany Lupi, Lucien Lupi, mon mari, le baryton à la voix d'or, Éditions Glyphe, Paris,

References

External links 
 Discographie sur encyclopedisque.fr
 Lucien Lupi chante L'Écho des neiges sur INA.fr
 Lucien Lupi Jalousie 1965 tango on YouTube

1926 births
People from Grasse
2005 deaths
French operatic baritones
20th-century French male singers